Albert Baker may refer to:

Albert C. Baker (1845–1921), American jurist and politician in Arizona
Albert J. Baker (1874–1964), American politician in Wisconsin
Albert Baker d'Isy (1906–1968), French cycling journalist
Al Baker (baseball) (1906–1982), pitcher for the Boston Red Sox
Albert William Baker (1918–2008), Canadian aviator
Albert "Ginger" Baker (born 1951), Northern Irish loyalist and soldier convicted of four murders
Albert Baker (cricketer) (1872–1948), English cricketer

See also
Al Baker (disambiguation)
Bert Baker (disambiguation)